Penicillium donkii is an anamorph species of the genus of Penicillium.

See also
 List of Penicillium species

References 

donkii
Fungi described in 1973